Steven George Condous  (10 December 1935 – 22 June 2018) was an Australian politician. From 1987 to 1993, he was the Lord Mayor of Adelaide before retiring to stand for state government. He was a Liberal Party member of the South Australian House of Assembly between 1993 and 2002, representing the electorate of Colton.

Condous was very active in local community causes including community clubs and sporting clubs.

Condous did not re-contest his seat in the 2002 election, which was subsequently won by Labor candidate Paul Caica, defeating Liberal preselect John Behenna.

Condous died on 22 June 2018 at the age of 82.

References

 

1935 births
2018 deaths
Members of the South Australian House of Assembly
Liberal Party of Australia members of the Parliament of South Australia
Members of the Order of Australia
Mayors and Lord Mayors of Adelaide
21st-century Australian politicians
Australian people of Greek descent